The 2021–22 season was the seventh season in the existence of UD Ibiza and the club's first ever season in the second division of Spanish football. In addition to the domestic league, Ibiza participated in this season's edition of the Copa del Rey.

Players

First-team squad

Out on loan

Transfers

In

Out

Pre-season and friendlies

Competitions

Overall record

Segunda División

League table

Results summary

Results by round

Matches
The league fixtures were announced on 30 June 2021.

Copa del Rey

References

UD Ibiza
Ibiza